The Southside Connector was a proposed expressway that would connect the Bourne Bridge to the Mid-Cape Highway near exit 59 on Cape Cod. Currently, a similar route is served by two two-lane highways, Sandwich Road and a stretch of US 6, on opposite sides of the Cape Cod Canal. Originally, the expressway was planned to be routed north of the canal. Plans were changed when it was discovered that the Sagamore Bridge was overcrowded and the nearby Bourne Bridge was under capacity. The route was shifted in the 1970s and the current plans of the route would go through the northern half of the Massachusetts Military Reservation.

History

Beginnings
The Southside Connector was first proposed in the 1950s as an extension of Massachusetts Route 25. It was part of the Cape Cod Expressway, which eventually morphed into the Mid-Cape Highway. It was originally planned to be a safe alternative to Route 6 which, was on the northern side of the Cape Cod Canal.

As early as 1962, the Massachusetts Department of Public Works conducted a study once questions on the plans were raised. One study concluded that the Sagamore Bridge was over capacity while the Bourne Bridge was under capacity. From these studies, it was determined that the expressway would cross the canal near the Bourne Bridge. Expressway connections would connect to Route 6 and 28 on the south side of the canal near the Bourne Rotary. Another crossing that would carry three lanes would be built next to the bridge to facilitate this extra traffic.

Rerouting
Between 1968 and 1977, studies concluded that the Southside Connector, as it was then known, would be routed along the south side of the canal. The route would begin at the Route 6 and 25 interchange at the canal, cross over the canal, turn east at the Bourne Rotary, which would be turned into an interchange, and go east until it reached the Mid-Cape Highway near exit 2. The total cost would be 35 million dollars.

Cancellation
The project was put on hold the next decade, but never cancelled outright when concerns arose about the status of the groundwater aquifers which sat under the reservation. Those aquifers were already polluted from years of military training, but the pollution was not discovered until about ten years later.

Possible revival
In recent years, the project has had renewed interest due to gridlock on both of the canal's sides. Although the project was projected to have cost thirty five million dollars in the 1970s, current estimates range from anywhere between 100 and 200 million dollars for construction.

Local leaders have expressed support for the project as long as it includes a third crossing of the canal, as the current two bridges are chronically over capacity. In 2009, when the deck of the Sagamore Bridge was reconstructed, there were increased calls to route traffic through the reservation as there was gridlock on both sides of the bridge and on the Scenic Highway.

For a while, the only hitch to the construction of the expressway in recent years, was a planned development called Canalside Commons which would have sat right to the east of the Bourne Rotary. Although the development was planned for well over 15 years, the recent economic downturn caused the project to be cancelled.

Criticism

Environmentalists and anti-sprawl advocates have been against renewed efforts to construct the expressway as it would likely bring more tourists and residents to the Cape, given that the current gridlock is likely deterring some visitors.  They also fear that another bridge would further add to the congestion that the local highways face.

References

External links

Transportation in Barnstable County, Massachusetts
Roads in Massachusetts